The Lone Pine was a solitary tree on the Gallipoli Peninsula in Turkey, which marked the site of the Battle of Lone Pine in August 1915. It was a Turkish or East Mediterranean pine (Pinus brutia).

Pines are often planted as memorials in civic parks around Australia to the Australian and New Zealand soldiers who fought in Gallipoli are also known as "Lone Pines" or "Gallipoli Pines".

Pinus brutia or Turkish Pine is native to the Gallipoli Peninsula and scattered specimens grew across the hills of the battlefield, and all the trees except the famous one were cut down by the Turks for construction of their defensive trenches.

Aleppo Pine (Pinus halepensis) is not native to the Gallipoli peninsula but grows naturally in other Mediterranean countries like Spain, Italy, Greece, Syria and Morocco but is widely planted. Logs and branches of Aleppo Pine were brought into Gallipoli from plantations beyond the Dardanelles and also used to roof the Turkish trenches and dug-outs.

However, the origins of both the Aleppo pine (Pinus halepensis) and the Turkish pine (Pinus brutia), now widely planted across Australian civic gardens as "Lone Pines", can be traced back to the Gallipoli battlefield of 1915.

The tree at the Lone Pine Cemetery at Gallipoli is of a third species: stone or umbrella pine (Pinus pinea).

The original "Lone Pine"
The "original" Lone Pine, a Turkish pine (Pinus brutia), is native to the Gallipoli Peninsula and scattered specimens grew across hills. The original Lone Pine was the sole survivor of a group of trees that had been cut down by Turkish soldiers for timber and branches to cover their trenches during the battle. This remaining solitary tree was used as target practice and was obliterated during the battle.

Other trees, particularly Aleppo pines (Pinus halepensis) which are widely planted across the region but not endemic to Gallipoli, were brought from plantations beyond the Dardanelles and also used to roof the Turkish trenches.

Turkish pines are closely related to Aleppo pine, and at the time were regarded as a subspecies, but now they are usually classified as a different species.

Pine cones from both species (Aleppo and Turkish Pines) were retrieved by various Australian soldiers and brought home to Australia.

Tree at Lone Pine Cemetery, Gallipoli

At the Lone Pine Cemetery on the Gallipoli peninsula, a solitary pine was planted in the 1920s to symbolise the original Lone Pine. This tree was inspected in 1987 by an Australian botanist and confirmed to be a stone pine (Pinus pinea) and is native to Spain and Italy.

Trees in Australia

Thomas Keith McDowell, an Australian soldier of the 23rd Battalion who fought at Gallipoli, brought a pine cone from actual “lone pine” at the battle site home to Australia. Many years later seeds from the cone were planted by his wife's aunt Emma Gray of Grassmere, near Warrnambool, Victoria and five seedlings emerged, with four surviving. These seedlings were planted in four different locations in Victoria: Wattle Park, Melbourne (8 May 1933), the Shrine of Remembrance (11 June 1933), the Soldiers Memorial Hall at The Sisters near Terang (18 June 1933) and Warrnambool Botanic Gardens (23 January 1934).

The tree at the Shrine Reserve was planted near the north-east corner of the building by Lieutenant-General Sir Stanley Savige, founder of Melbourne Legacy, at a formal ceremony. In 2005 the tree required cable bracing following the loss of a major limb and in August 2012, despite measures taken to try to save the tree from the effects of disease caused by the fungus Diplodia pinea, it was removed. A "grandchild tree" was planted nearby in 2006. A Middle Park man, Andrew Lees, collected cones from the broken limb in 2005 and by 2015 had managed to germinate about 20 seedlings.

The trees grown from Thomas Keith McDowell's cone are Turkish Pine, Pinus brutia, and can claim to be the only true descendants of the original Lone Pine at Gallipoli.

Another soldier, Lance Corporal Benjamin Smith from the 3rd Battalion, also retrieved a cone from the battle site and sent it back to his mother in Australia, (Mrs McMullen), who had lost another son, Mark Smith, at the battle. This cone was an Aleppo Pine (Pinus halepensis) which is not endemic to the area. Logs and branches of Aleppo Pine had been brought into Gallipoli from plantations beyond the Dardanelles and used to roof the Turkish trenches and dug-outs. This seems to be the most likely source of Lance Corporal Smith's cone.

Benjamin Smith's cone was an Aleppo pine, Pinus halepensis retrieved from a Turkish trench and seeds were planted by his mother in 1928, and two seedlings were raised. One was presented to her home town of Inverell, New South Wales and the other was forwarded to Canberra where it was planted by Prince Henry, Duke of Gloucester at the Australian War Memorial (AWM) in October 1934. The AWM lone pine lost two of its large lower limbs by strong winds preceding a thunderstorm on 27 December 2008.  However, tree surgeons were able to save the historic tree.

The most common Lone Pine tree planted in civic parks across Australia is Aleppo Pine (Pinus halepensis) with seedlings often derived from a parent tree planted in the grounds of the Australian War Memorial in Canberra.

However, the origins of both the Aleppo pine (Pinus halepensis) and the Turkish pine (Pinus brutia), now widely planted across Australian civic gardens as "Lone Pines" can be traced back to the Gallipoli battlefield of 1915.

Both Melbourne Legacy and the Yarralumla Nursery in Canberra have raised and grown seedlings over a number of years, sourced from both species and from both trees at the Shrine of Remembrance and the Australian War Memorial respectively. They have presented to schools as well as ex-service and other organisations throughout Australia.

There are many memorial plaques in front of fine specimens of  "Lone Pines" in cities and gardens across the country which are Pinus halepensis and claim to be direct descendants of the solitary tree stood on the ridgetop. This is not technically right. Turkish pines are very closely related to Aleppo pine, and at the time were regarded as a subspecies, but now they are usually classified as a different species.

Other "Lone Pines" include:
Plaques at the base of the pine tree at the Oatley Park Avenue entrance to Oatley Park, NSW, state it was planted in 1920 by Owen Jones Davies from pine cones obtained from Lone Pine, Gallipoli.
The two Lone Pine seedlings at the Australian Defence Force Academy in Canberra were presented by the RSL on Remembrance Day, 11 November 1987.
The pine at the Battle of Lone Pine memorial at Adelaide's National War Memorial is accompanied by a plaque stating "This pine is a seedling related to the original Lone Pine on Gallipoli"
A seedling of Pinus brutia, propagated from the original tree at Lone Pine was planted in the grounds of the Victorian School of Forestry at Creswick on 23 March 1975. A plaque was also unveiled by Legacy.

"Lone Pines" with accompanying plaques:

Trees in New Zealand
In Auckland, two trees identified as "Lone Pines" have been planted. One is a Pinus canariensis planted at Waikumete cemetery in 1961 and another is  a Pinus radiata at Auckland War Memorial Museum, planted by Victoria Cross recipient Cyril Bassett on Anzac Day in 1950. A tree identified as "The Anzac Pine" stands on Te Mata Peak at Havelock North in Hawkes Bay. Although a specimen of Pinus brutia was originally planted, the current tree is identified as the species Pinus radiata. Two  specimens of Pinus halepensis, planted in 1951, are located at the Lone Pine Memorial at the cemetery in Taradale, and further specimens are located at King Edward Park in Stratford and Queens Park in Whanganui. There is a "Lone Pine" at the Paeroa golf course, at the ladies tee, on the second hole. This tree appears to be New Zealand's only authentic Pinus brutia that can be traced back to the original pines, according to "Excerpts from NZ Journal of Forestry, May 2007". In both Dixon Park, Greymouth, and Victoria Park, Christchurch, are plaques which claim that the nearby pine tree was grown from a seedling of the Gallipoli Lone Pine.

See also
 List of individual trees

References

2010s individual tree deaths
Gallipoli campaign
Individual pine trees
Individual trees in Turkey
Monuments and memorials in Australia
Monuments and memorials in New Zealand